The UEFA Women's Cup 2008–09 is the eighth edition of the UEFA Women's Cup football club tournament (since rebranded as the UEFA Women's Champions League), the most important trophy in European club football. The first qualifying round started on 4 September 2008 and the final over two legs was held on 16 and 22 May 2009. Duisburg defeated Zvezda Perm 7–1 on aggregate to claim their first UEFA Cup title.

First qualifying round

Group A1 
Tournament in Šiauliai (Lithuania).

Group A2 
Tournament in Niš (Serbia).

Group A3 
Tournament in Skiponjat (Macedonia)

Group A4 
Tournament in Oslo (Norway). Georgia's champion FC Iveria Khashuri withdrew their team from the competition.

Group A5 
Tournament in Šaľa (Slovakia).

Group A6 
Tournament in Osijek (Croatia).

Group A7 
Tournament in Neulengbach (Austria).

Group A8 
Tournament in Wroclaw (Poland).

Group A9 
Tournament in Sarajevo (Bosnia and Herzegovina).

Second qualifying round

Group B1 
Tournament in Oslo (Norway).

Group B2 
Tournament in Umeå (Sweden).

Group B3 
Tournament in Lyon (France).

Group B4 
Tournament in Kalush (Ukraine).

Quarter-finals

First Leg

Second Leg

Semi-finals

First Leg

Second Leg

Finals

First Leg

Second Leg

Top goalscorers 
(excluding qualifying rounds)

References

External links 
 2008-09 season at UEFA website

Women
2008-09
UEFA
UEFA